Certeze is a commune of 5,560 inhabitants situated in Satu Mare County, Romania. It is composed of three villages: Certeze, Huta-Certeze (Lajosvölgy) and Moișeni (Mózesfalu).

References

Communes in Satu Mare County